Lucia Šušková (born 27 March 1993) is a Slovak football midfielder currently playing for Czarni Sosnowiec in Poland's Ekstraliga. She has also played for Žirafa Žilina and Slovan Bratislava in Slovakia's First League, FC Neunkirch in Switzerland's Nationalliga A and TS Mitech Żywiec in the Ekstraliga, and she is a member of the Slovak national team.

Honours 
Slovan Bratislava
Winner
 Slovak Women's First League: 2011–12

References

External links 

 

1993 births
Living people
Women's association football midfielders
Slovak women's footballers
Slovakia women's international footballers
FC Neunkirch players
ŠK Slovan Bratislava (women) players
Slovak expatriate footballers
Slovak expatriate sportspeople in Switzerland
Expatriate women's footballers in Switzerland
Slovak expatriate sportspeople in Poland
Expatriate women's footballers in Poland
TS Mitech Żywiec players
KKS Czarni Sosnowiec players
People from Čadca
Sportspeople from the Žilina Region